Levski Peak can refer to:

Levski Peak (Bulgaria), in the Balkan Mountains, in central Bulgaria
Levski Peak (Antarctica), in the Tangra Mountains, in Livingston Island, Antarctica